The Battle of Anderlecht, sometimes referred to as the Fight of Anderlecht, took place in Anderlecht near Brussels in Belgium between the Habsburg monarchy and the French Republic on 13 November 1792, during the first year of the French Revolutionary Wars.

Prelude
After the victory of Jemappes, the Imperial troops endeavored to delay the victorious march of the troops of the French Republic. On 13 November 1792, by the rear guard of the Austrians, commanded by Duke Ferdinand Frédéric Auguste of Wurtemberg, met at Sint-Pieters-Leeuw, on the way to Brussels, a French avant-garde commanded by Harville, Stengel, Rosières and Thouvenot, soon followed by the head general of the troop commanded by Dumouriez who pursued the Austrians to the heights of Anderlecht.

The Battle
The French Army commanded by Dumouriez, initially made up of 3,000  volunteers, launched an assault on the lines of the Duke of Württemberg, accompanied by 20,000 men, on the heights of Anderlecht. After a very lively cannonade and the main fighting which lasted 6 hours, the French troops, assisted by the reinforcements which arrived after crossing the Senne, ended up reaching 35,000 volunteers, forcing the imperial army to withdraw in disorder on Brussels, crossing back during the night.

Aftermath 
The Imperials lost around 500 men on the battlefield and several pieces of artillery destroyed. Their cavalry, under the command of Maximilian Latour, managed to slow down the pursuit of the French and avoid heavier losses. The next day, 14 November 1792, Dumouriez made his entry into Brussels, capital of the Austrian Netherlands, to the cheers of the inhabitants, a certain number of Walloon soldiers rallied to the French army.

References 

Battles of the War of the First Coalition
Conflicts in 1792
1792 in the Habsburg monarchy
1792 in the Holy Roman Empire
Flanders Campaign 1793–94